Thornley may refer to:

Places
 Thornley, Durham, a village in County Durham, England
 Thornley, Weardale, another village in County Durham, England
 Thornley-with-Wheatley, a civil parish in Lancashire, England

Other uses
 Thornley (surname)
 Thornley Stoker, 1st Baronet (1845–1912), Irish medical writer, anatomist and surgeon
 Thornley (band) (founded 2002), a Canadian post-grunge/hard rock band

See also
 Thornley v. United States (1885), a U.S. Supreme Court case relating to military pay